Clear to Venus is the third album by American singer-songwriter Andrew Peterson, released in 2001.

Background
Peterson worked with Glenn Rosenstein, in the production of this album. Essential Records released the album on September 11, 2001.

Musical style
Reviewing the album for Christianity Today, Russ Breimeier recognizes, "Though it's still very much rooted in acoustic guitar-based folk music (like Andrew's first album, Carried Along), there's something about Clear to Venus that's more "roots pop" in sound."

Critical reception

Giving the album a ten out of ten from Cross Rhythms, Paul Obrey writes, "The comparison is made not to describe Peterson's style of music, though the Mullins influence is clearly there, but to portray the artistry and ingenuity of this style of storytelling, that brings revelation of God's character." Ashleigh Kittle, awarding the album three stars at AllMusic, states, "Clear to Venus clearly testifies to Peterson's ability to relate to audiences in an honest and personal manner."

Track listing

Chart performance

References

2001 albums
Andrew Peterson (musician) albums
Essential Records (Christian) albums